Gordon Thomas Calthrop Campbell, Baron Campbell of Croy,  (8 June 1921 – 26 April 2005) was a British Conservative politician and diplomat.

Biography

Early life and career 
Campbell was born in Quetta, British India (now in Pakistan), the son of Major General James Alexander Campbell and was educated at Rockport School in Holywood, County Down, then at Wellington College before joining the Royal Artillery in 1939. He fought in the Second World War with the Royal Artillery from 1940, winning the Military Cross and Bar. Invalided out in 1947 with the honorary rank of major, he served the Foreign Office in New York and Vienna until 1957.

House of Commons 
Elected to Parliament in 1959, he served as Member of Parliament for the constituency of Moray and Nairn until February 1974 when he was defeated by Winnie Ewing of the Scottish National Party. He served as a Government Whip, 1961–62; Lord Commissioner of the Treasury and Scottish Whip, 1962–63; Parliamentary Under-Secretary of State for Scotland, 1963–64. He was Opposition Spokesman on Defence, 1967–68 and a member of the Shadow Cabinet, 1969–70.

Secretary of State for Scotland 
He was Secretary of State for Scotland during the whole of Edward Heath's government. During his term in office the issues of fishing and oil led to him losing his Moray coastal seat to the SNP. Government papers released under the 30 year rule reveal an attitude that may explain that loss. Papers from 1970 revealed how the Scottish Office was prepared to have a "weaker and less efficient national fleet" to enable the UK to sign up to the controversial Common Fisheries Policy. On oil in 1972 Campbell was against any move to pump oil revenues directly into the Scottish economy despite Heath asking government departments to explore such an arrangements to help revive Scotland's economy with "its own resources". Further papers from 1974 revealed how he proposed "exceptional measures" to force Shetland Islands Council to accept an oil terminal without financial benefit to the islands.

House of Lords 
After being defeated by Winnie Ewing of the Scottish National Party at the February 1974 general election, Campbell was made a life peer as Baron Campbell of Croy, of Croy in the County of Nairn on 9 January 1975. He became Chairman of the Scottish Board in 1976, and was Vice President of the Advisory Committee on Pollution at Sea from 1976 to 1984.

Personal life
He married Nicola Madan, daughter of Geoffrey Spencer Madan and his wife Marjorie Noble, and had three children. 
 Hon. Colin Ian Calthrop Campbell b. 1950
 Colonel Hon. Alastair James Calthrop Campbell (6 Jan 1952 – 24 Aug 2021)
 Hon. Christina Marjorie Campbell b. 1953.

The Campbell family lived at Holme Rose at Croy in the Nairn Valley. In 2019, the property was put on the market for £2.3 million.

Arms

Footnotes

Torrance, David, The Scottish Secretaries (Birlinn 2006)

External links 
 

1921 births
2005 deaths
British Army personnel of World War II
Campbell of Croy
Deputy Lieutenants in Scotland
Members of the Parliament of the United Kingdom for Scottish constituencies
Members of the Privy Council of the United Kingdom
Ministers in the Macmillan and Douglas-Home governments, 1957–1964
People educated at Rockport School
People educated at Wellington College, Berkshire
People from Lossiemouth
Politics of Moray
Recipients of the Military Cross
Royal Artillery officers
Scottish Conservative Party MPs
Secretaries of State for Scotland
UK MPs 1959–1964
UK MPs 1964–1966
UK MPs 1966–1970
UK MPs 1970–1974
UK MPs who were granted peerages
Unionist Party (Scotland) MPs
Life peers created by Elizabeth II